The Gombak District is an administrative district located in the state of Selangor, Malaysia. The district was created on February 1, 1974, the same day when Kuala Lumpur was declared a Federal Territory. Until 1997, Rawang was the district capital; the capital has been moved to Bandar Baru Selayang. Gombak borders Kuala Lumpur to the southeast and the Genting Highlands to the east. Both Gombak and Kuala Lumpur, along with some other districts in Selangor, are situated within the Klang Valley. Other localities that are situated in Gombak district include Batu Arang, Kuang, Rawang, Kundang, Gombak Town, Selayang, Batu Caves and Hulu Kelang.

The International Islamic University Malaysia (IIUM/UIAM) main campus is also located here as well as the Batu Caves. Gombak is also home to an aboriginal Orang Asli settlement, and it is the site of the Orang Asli Museum.

Gombak River merges with the larger Klang River in Kuala Lumpur. The meeting place of the two rivers is the birthplace of Kuala Lumpur. At the center of the confluence is the Masjid Jamek.

Gombak (town) also refers to as a locality (town/area/suburb) in the northern and central portion of the Setapak subdistrict (both in Gombak and Kuala Lumpur). Before 1974, Gombak was a town before it became a district. Gombak was home to the settlements of the first Minangkabau immigrants in the 1800s and was established soon after. Old mosques in the Gombak area such as the Masjid Lama Batu 6 Gombak are still standing to this day. Today, Gombak can be referred to both the town and district itself but the locals usually refers Gombak as the town, not the district.

Administrative divisions

Gombak District is divided into 4 mukims, which are:
 Batu
 Rawang
 Setapak
 Ulu Klang

Government
Gombak is partly administrated by two different local governments completely within it, which fall under the state jurisdiction, not the district:
 Ampang Jaya Municipal Council (Among Mukim Ulu Kelang of the district)
 Selayang Municipal Council (Most part of district except Mukim Ulu Kelang area)

Demographics 

The following is based on Department of Statistics Malaysia 2010 census.

Gombak has one of the largest Hui Muslim Communities in Malaysia. Nearly 60% of Hui Chinese live in Gombak.

Education

National education is under the purview of the Gombak District Education Office. As of 2014, there were 53 national type primary schools, eight national type (Chinese) primary schools, seven national type (Tamil) primary schools, 30 national type secondary schools (SMK), two national type secondary boarding schools (SM Berasrama Penuh), two national type secondary Islam religious school (SM Agama) and two national type secondary vocational schools (Kolej Vokasional)

Tourist attractions

Gombak has a large amount of recreational area and tourist attraction.

 Batu Caves
 Forest Research Institute Malaysia
 Batu Dam, Batu Caves
 Gua Damai Extreme Park, Batu Caves
 Batu Arang Heritage Town
 Orang Asli Museum, Gombak
 Hutan Lipur Bukit Lagong, Selayang
 Hutan Lipur Sungai Tua, Selayang
 Kancing Forest Park, Rawang
 Selayang Hot Spring, Selayang
 Commonwealth Forest Park, Rawang
 Templer Park, Rawang
 Tasik Biru Kundang, Kundang
 National Zoo of Malaysia
 Klang Gates Dam
 Batu Asah Waterfall, Hulu Kelang
 Ampang Forest Reserve, Hulu Kelang
 Selangor Fruit Valley, Batu Arang

Federal Parliament and State Assembly Seats

List of Gombak district representatives in the Federal Parliament (Dewan Rakyat) 

List of Gombak district representatives in the State Legislative Assembly (Dewan Undangan Negeri)

Transportation

By rail
 Batu Caves station serve the  KTM Komuter train service.
 Kepong Sentral station serve the  KTM Komuter, KTM Intercity, KTM ETS and   MRT Putrajaya train services. 
 Gombak station is the only LRT lines thru Gombak district and also has only one station which is  LRT KJ 
 Sungai Buloh station is an interchange station to cater the train services for  KTM Komuter, KTM Intercity, KTM ETS and the future  MRT Putrajaya Line 
 Rawang station is one of the main station that serve  KTM Komuter, KTM Intercity and KTM ETS train services.
 Kuang station only serve by  KTM Komuter train service.

By car
 Federal Route 1 is the main thoroughfare going through Rawang town, Selayang and Batu Caves.
 Federal Route 68 Old Gombak–Bentong road also runs through here before terminating in Bentong, Pahang.
 PLUS Expressway also runs through Gombak district, providing exits to 114 Sungai Buloh North, 115 Rawang South and 116 Rawang.
 East Coast Expressway is the district's main gateway to the east coast states of Pahang, Terengganu and Kelantan, as the Gombak Toll Plaza.
 Kuala Lumpur–Kuala Selangor Expressway connects Ijok near Kuala Selangor to Templer's Park near Rawang with  exits to 2505 Kundang, 2506 Kuang and 2508 Templer Park are runs through Gombak district.
 Guthrie Corridor Expressway also runs through Gombak district, providing exits to 115 Rawang South and 3501 Kuang, which is the beginning of the Guthrie Corridor Expressway.

See also

 Districts of Malaysia

References